Luis Martínez (27 July 1925 – 25 November 2008) was a Spanish boxer. He competed in the men's flyweight event at the 1948 Summer Olympics.

References

1925 births
2008 deaths
Spanish male boxers
Olympic boxers of Spain
Boxers at the 1948 Summer Olympics
Boxers from Barcelona
Flyweight boxers